David Gilbarg (17 September 1918, Boston, Massachusetts – 20 April 2001, Palo Alto, California) was an American mathematician, and a professor emeritus at Stanford University.

He completed his Ph.D. at Indiana University in 1941; his dissertation, titled On the Structure of the group of p-adic l-units, was written under the supervision of Emil Artin.

Gilbarg was co-author, together with his student Neil Trudinger, of the book Elliptic Partial Differential Equations of Second Order. Besides Trudinger, Gilbarg's doctoral students include Jerald Ericksen and James Serrin.

References

 Obituary, Stanford News Service, May 1, 2001.
 Memorial Resolution by Leon Simon, Richard Schoen, and Brian White.
 McTutor biography
 

1918 births
2001 deaths
20th-century American mathematicians
PDE theorists
People from Boston
Mathematicians from Massachusetts
Indiana University Bloomington alumni
Stanford University faculty